Benjamin Kruse may refer to:

 Benjamin Kruse (footballer) (born 1978), German football player
 Benjamin Kruse (politician) (born 1978), member of the Minnesota State Senate